The 2007 FIM Motocross World Championship was the 51st F.I.M. Motocross Racing World Championship season. In the MX1 class, Steve Ramon took his second world title despite not winning a Grand Prix all season. In the MX2 class Tony Cairoli also won his second world title, while in MX3 Yves Demaria won his third and final world championship.

MX1

Calendar and Results

Entry List

Riders Championship

MX2

Calendar and Results

Entry List

Riders Championship

MX3

Calendar and Results

Riders Championship

References

FIM Motocross World Championship season
2007